Kerstin Wasems (born 20 September 1979) is a German former footballer who played as a goalkeeper. She made one appearance for the Germany national team in 1998.

References

External links
 

1979 births
Living people
German women's footballers
Women's association football goalkeepers
Germany women's international footballers
Place of birth missing (living people)